Three referendums were held in Switzerland in 1971. The first was held on 7 February on introducing women's suffrage at the federal level, and was approved by 66% of voters. The second and third were held on 6 June on a constitutional amendment to introduce the human right to a non-hazardous environment and a federal resolution on federal finances. In the first referendum in which women were allowed to vote, both were approved by voters.

Results

February: Women's suffrage

June: Constitutional amendment

June: Federal finances

References

1971 referendums
1971 in Switzerland
Referendums in Switzerland
Women's rights in Switzerland
Women's suffrage in Switzerland
Suffrage referendums
1971 in women's history